Rawah is a district in Al Anbar Governorate, Iraq. Its capital is the city of Rawah.

References

Districts of Al Anbar Governorate